Henry Cowper may refer to:

 Henry Cowper (1668–1707), MP for Horsham
 Henry Cowper (1758–1840), British lawyer
 Henry Cowper (died 1887) (1836–1887), MP for Hertfordshire

See also
Henry Cooper (disambiguation)